Charlie Harris is an American former Negro league second baseman who played in the 1940s.

Harris made his Negro leagues debut in 1943 with the Cincinnati Clowns and Chicago American Giants. The following season, he played for the Jacksonville Red Caps.

References

External links
 and Seamheads

Year of birth missing
Place of birth missing
Cincinnati Clowns players
Chicago American Giants players
Jacksonville Red Caps players
Baseball second basemen